The Bangombe Plateau (sometimes written as Bongombé) is a plateau covering  east of Moanda, in the Haut Ogooue Region of Gabon. Exploitation of manganese deposits started on the plateau in 1953 by the Compagnie Minière de l'Ogooué (COMILOG).

It is also one of the naturally occurring fission reactors.

Features

 The town of Moanda is built on the edge of the slopes of the plateau.
 The plateau is also home to an airfield and a golf course.
 Moanda Railway Station lies in the north of the plateau.

See also

 Oklo

Plateaus of Gabon